Harry Connolly may refer to:

 Harry Connolly (American football) (1920–2006), American football player
 Harry Connolly (writer), American author of the Twenty Palaces novel series